Woodstock Community Unit School District 200 is a public K-12 school district based in Woodstock, Illinois. The school district serves the communities of Woodstock, Bull Valley, Greenwood and the west side of Wonder Lake in McHenry County, Illinois.

District information
Total enrollment for the district is approximately 6,600 students each school year.   The current superintendent is Mike Moan.

The district is governed by a seven-member school board.

Current schools

Elementary schools
Verda Dierzen Early Learning Center, Woodstock.
The school offers classes in early Special Education, bilingual classes and pre-kindergarten. It is named after Mrs. Verda Dierzen, a Woodstock woman who founded the school and taught throughout the district. Dierzen died in April 2008, at age 91. The school's colors are the primary colors; the mascot is the dinosaur. Nearly 830 students are enrolled at Verda Dierzen.
Dean Street Elementary School, Woodstock
Mary Endres Elementary School, Woodstock
Named for Dr. Mary P. Endres, who served as Superintendent of Schools for Rural Consolidated District 10, a forerunner of District 2000, and later taught at Purdue University and Governors State University.
Greenwood Elementary School
Olson Elementary School
Prairiewood Elementary School
Westwood Elementary School

Middle schools
Creekside Middle School
The school opened in September 2007, and has an enrolment of 736. The school colors are Carolina Blue, Navy Blue and white. The school mascot is the Falcon.
Northwood Middle School

High schools
Woodstock High School
Woodstock North High School
School Colors: Black, Teal & Silver. School Mascot: Thunder.

Grades 4 through 12
Clay Academy

References

External links
 

School districts in McHenry County, Illinois
Woodstock, Illinois